Potentilla millefolia is a species of cinquefoil known by the common names cutleaf cinquefoil  and feather cinquefoil. It is native to Oregon, Nevada and eastern California, where it grows in moist mountain meadows and similar habitat. The plant produces a basal rosette from a taproot, then a decumbent stem up to about 20 centimeters in maximum length. The elongated leaves are made up of several overlapping pairs of deeply lobed leaflets. The inflorescence at the tip of the stem is a cyme of a few flowers, each with usually five yellow petals under a centimeter long.

References

External links
Jepson Manual Treatment
Photo gallery

millefolia
Flora of California
Flora of Nevada
Flora of Oregon
Flora without expected TNC conservation status